Bytyń  is a village in the administrative district of Gmina Wola Uhruska, within Włodawa County, Lublin Voivodeship, in eastern Poland, close to the border with Ukraine.

References

Villages in Włodawa County
Kholm Governorate
Lublin Voivodeship (1919–1939)